Kingdom Rush is a tower defense game developed by Uruguay-based Ironhide Game Studio and published by Armor Games, released as a free flash browser game on July 28, 2011, on iPad on December 19, 2011, on Android in May 2013, and a Unity port in January 2014 via Steam. A sequel, Kingdom Rush: Frontiers, was released on June 6, 2013. The third installment of the franchise, Kingdom Rush: Origins, was launched on November 20, 2014. It was released on PC on October 18, 2018. On November 22, 2018, Ironhide Studios released a sequel, Kingdom Rush Vengeance, in which the player plays as Vez'nan's servant, helping him regain his throne. The game was released for the Nintendo Switch on July 30, 2020.

Description
Kingdom Rush is a series of tower defense games set in a medieval fantasy setting. In line with the tower defense genre, each level presents a pre-determined path with spaces along the sides called 'Strategy Points', where the player can build towers. Enemies will come along the path in waves and it is the player's job to make sure the enemies are dispatched by towers before they reach the end. By spending the gold earned by defeating enemies you can upgrade towers, making them deal more damage or in the case of the barracks have more health. In each game there are four basic types of towers to strategize with; mage, archers, barracks, and artillery. Different enemies in the game sport resistances to certain types of damage, so which tower you put where is the lynchpin of a good level strategy. At the players disposal are spells that recharge over time. The reinforcements spell summons two brave soldiers to the path to block and deal damage to enemies, the meteor spell (called thunderbolt and soul impact in later games) calls down a rain of fire to blast away enemies.

Completing each level will give the player stars, a currency within the game to spend on upgrades. These star upgrades give a serious boost to spells, towers, and friendly units on the battlefield. After completing a campaign level with 18 or more lives remaining (out of 20), the player earns 3 stars and the Heroic Mode and Iron Challenge are unlocked for this level. These are more challenging modes that take place on the same path and impose various constraints. In these modes, the player will only be given one life, so any enemy surviving to the defense point triggers a failure. Heroic Mode and Iron Challenge reward one star each when completed.

The hero room and shop were introduced in an update to the original game on April 25, 2012. To date the shop remains a feature only in the mobile versions of the game, and more than half of the heroes are behind an in app purchase. These hero units provide a huge boost in defense while playing, which affords the levels to be harder. They can be positioned anywhere on the path, and each have a unique style of fighting along with special abilities. The shop relies on the gem currency, only found in the mobile version of the games, and the player can purchase extra spells, power ups, or path clearing bombs to aid in beating levels.

All of Kingdom Rush's male characters as well as most lines said by towers are voiced by Sean Crisden, while the female characters are voiced by Jennifer Ann Perry and others. The game was featured in a problem in the 2012 Google Code Jam programming contest.

Synopsis 
The player takes the role of a general serving King Denas of Linirea. After being dispatched to fight against outlaws reported around the city of Southport, the General learns that the outlaw gangs are actually orc legions serving under the evil wizard Vez'nan. Discovering that Vez'nan has invaded Linirea, the General returns to the capital city and manages to defend it from the enemy army, proceeding into the nearby mountains with the objective of defeating the wizard. Arriving at the Stormcloud Temple, the resident sorcerers use a spell to teleport the king's army into the wasteland near Vez'nan's tower. The General fights through the wasteland and reaches the tower, defeating Vez'nan and returning home in celebration. In a post-credits scene, a hooded figure discovers and claims Vez'nan's wizard's staff, intending to use it for his own ends.

Reception

The iOS version received an average score of 89/100 on review aggregator site Metacritic. , Kingdom Rush is the most played game in the site with over 70 million plays, while Kingdom Rush: Frontiers with 25.6 million plays is situated in the 10th place. Origins, the third game in the franchise captured similar reviews with a 96% approval by users according to Google, a 9.4/10 rating by CNET, and a 9/10 by the game review site GamePitt. The fourth game released in 2018, Vengeance, offered new innovations to the franchise's formula but remained true to form according to Polygon.

"Probably the best true tower defense game. It's funny, it's polished, and it's hard as balls."
- IGN (Editor's choice 9/10 "Amazing")

"One of the most engaging TD games we've played..."
-Slidetoplay.com (STP Score of 4 out of 4 "Must Have")

"Kingdom Rush can be filed in the thin folder marked "games that are pretty much perfect"
-JayisGames.com

"This is one kingdom you'll be in no rush to escape from"
-PocketGamer (Gold Award - Score 9)

"Kingdom Rush: Vengeance stays strategic and lovable despite serious changes to the formula" (Polygon, 2018)

Awards
The game was awarded the first prize at the 2011 Uruguayan Videogame Contest.

Other awards:
Game of the Year 2011 - Jayisgames
Strategy game of the year 2011 - Jayisgames
Game of the year - Mochiawards 2012
Community Choice - Mochiawards 2012
IGN Editor's Choice

Tablet and mobile version
On July 4, 2012, Ironhide Game Studio announced a comic version of Kingdom Rush that would be available for mobile and tablet devices. It became available on October 1, 2012, as a free download from iTunes. IOS and Android versions of the game contain several in app purchases, a feature which the steam versions of the games do not have. In the original game, Frontiers, and Origins there are additional hero characters locked behind a paywall. Kingdom Rush: Vengeance has received the most critique for its inclusion of towers, heros, and gems which are buyable in the mobile but free in the steam version of the game.

Prequel and sequels
On August 25, 2011, Ironhide Studios announced a sequel to Kingdom Rush titled Kingdom Rush Frontiers. The game was slated for a Spring 2013 release. On December 12, 2012, the studio revealed its first screen capture of the game. On March 20, 2013, Ironhide released a teaser trailer of Kingdom Rush Frontiers. On June 6, 2013, the sequel was released for iOS. On September 26, 2013, it was released for Android, and on November 22, 2013, for Flash. The game has a Metacritic score of 85/100 based on 16 critic reviews. The game was released for Nintendo Switch on February 27, 2020. On November 12, 2021, it was released on Apple Arcade as Kingdom Rush Frontiers TD+.

The third installment of the franchise, Kingdom Rush: Origins, was launched on November 20, 2014 on iOS and Android platforms. It is the prequel to the original game.

Ironhide Studios announced their intention to make a fourth Kingdom Rush game in early 2017. On July 17, 2018, Ironhide Studios announced that the new sequel would be called Kingdom Rush Vengeance. The player serves as Lord Vez'nan's general to help him regain his throne. It was released on November 22, 2018 and received a Metacritic score of 88/100.

Board game 
In April 2019, Lucky Duck Games, a board game company that specialises in transforming computer games in to table-top games, launched a Kickstarter campaign to produce a 2–4 player co-operative board game version of Kingdom Rush. The target amount was reached within an hour, and subsequently reached over 5000% of the target. The game, called 'Kingdom Rush: Rift in Time' is set after the events of the computer games, with the kingdom battling the 'Time Mage'. Hordes are defeated by being overlayed with polyominos. Players play as some of the heroes from the original game, and work together to upgrade towers, which are rebuilt each round. Towers are built by the buying of tower cards, and upgraded by players passing their cards to others at the start of the round. The game was released in April 2020.

References

External links
 

2011 video games
Android (operating system) games
Browser games
IOS games
Linux games
Tower defense video games
Steam Greenlight games
Windows games
Video games developed in Uruguay
Flash games
Armor Games games
Single-player video games